Gashi may refer to:
 Gashi (tribe), a major historical tribe of northern Albania
 Gashi (surname), a surname associated with the tribe
 Gashi (rapper), an American rapper

See also 
 Gashi, Iran (disambiguation), places in Iran
 Mado Gashi, a small town in Kenya
 Gaši, a Serbo-Croatian version of Gashi
 Innocent Thing, a South Korean film